Orimulsion is a registered trademark name for a bitumen-based fuel that was developed for industrial use by Intevep, the Research and Development Affiliate of Petroleos de Venezuela SA (PDVSA), following earlier collaboration on oil emulsions with BP.

Source of the bitumen
Like coal and oil, bitumen occurs naturally and is obtained from the world's largest deposit in the Orinoco Belt in Venezuela. The deposit is estimated to be more than 1,300 billion barrels (190 billion m3) of bitumen, an amount approximately equivalent to the world's estimated proven oil reserves.

Preparation
Raw bitumen has an extremely high viscosity and specific gravity between 8 and 10 API gravity, at ambient temperatures and is unsuitable for direct use in conventional power stations. Orimulsion is made by mixing the bitumen with about 30% fresh water and a small amount of surfactant. The result behaves similarly to fuel oil. An alcohol-based surfactant recently replaced the original phenol-based version; improving the transport properties of the fuel and eliminating the health concerns associated with the phenol group of surfactants.

Advantages
As a fuel for electricity generation, Orimulsion has a number of attractive characteristics:
 the known reserves of bitumen are very large;
 it is currently priced to be competitive with internationally traded coal;
 it is relatively easy and safe to produce, transport, handle and store;
 it is easy to ignite and has good combustion characteristics;
 it can be used in power stations designed to run on coal or heavy fuel oil, with suitable modification.

Disadvantages
If there is a spill while shipping over water the mixture de-emulsifies and the bitumen drops out of suspension.

It is a non-Newtonian fluid, and if it is allowed to cool below 30 °C, it will 'set'.  Pumping becomes impossible, and there is no way of restarting operations or the flow through the pipeline again.

Decreasing usage
Orimulsion is currently used as a commercial boiler fuel in power plants worldwide (e.g., Japan, Italy and China). Use of fuel used to be much wider and demand was increasing. However, many of PDVSA's engineers were fired following the Venezuelan general strike of 2002–03. Orimulsion had been the pride of the PDVSA engineers, so Orimulsion fell out of favor with the key political leaders. As a result, the government is trying to "Wind Down" the Orimulsion program. The one exception is the sales of Orimulsion to China. The Venezuelan government has close ties to China, as it has with Cuba. The result is that China is still supplied with Orimulsion, while the rest of the world has either had their supplies terminated, or are still experiencing the "Wind Down" phase. Orimulsion still has excellent potential for domestic consumption.

Another reason given by current PDVSA management is that with rising crude oil prices, it has been found that mixing or diluting Orinoco bitumen (extra-heavy oil) with a lighter crude oil can make this blend more profitable as a crude oil on the world market than by selling it as Orimulsion. An example of this is the popular Merey blend (Orinoco bitumen and Mesa crude oil). ConocoPhillips along with PDVSA operate the Merey Sweeny  (bpd) delayed coker, vacuum tower and related facilities at ConocoPhillips' refinery in Sweeny, Texas, U.S.A. for  processing and upgrading heavy sour Merey crude oil.

Air pollutant control technology that is commonly available can limit emissions from Orimulsion to levels considered "Best Available Control Technology", as defined by the United States Environmental Protection Agency.

References

Further reading
 
 
 Oil and Gas Journal: Emulsion fuel options still viable for heavy oil

External links
 PDVSA Bitor

Petroleum products
Venezuelan inventions
Venezuelan brands
PDVSA